Ktown Cowboys is a 2015 American comedy film directed by Daniel Park and written by Danny Cho and Brian Chung. The film stars Danny Cho, Bobby Choy, Peter Jae, Sunn Wee, Shane Yoon and Eric Roberts. The film was released on March 18, 2016, by Freestyle Releasing.

Cast
 Danny Cho as Danny
 Bobby Choy as Robby
 Peter Jae as Peter
 Sunn Wee as Sunny 
 Shane Yoon as Jason 
 Eric Roberts as Al 
 Steve Byrne as CFO Ben
 Young Chul Kim as Jack "Jack of All Trades"
 Simon Rhee as Henry 
 Sean Richard Dulake as Adam 
 Daniel Dae Kim as David 
 Ken Jeong as Ken Jeong
 Rhonda Aldrich as Bev
 Stefanie Carpenter as Stephanie
 Herson Chavez as Sammy
 Tiffany Chung as Hanna
 Lee Doud as Billy Song
 Tamarra Graham as Janice
 Camila Greenberg as Esther
 Ellen Ho as Tracy
 Angie Kim as Mindy

Release
The film premiered at South by Southwest on March 15, 2016. The film was released on March 18, 2016, by Freestyle Releasing.

References

External links
 

2015 films
2015 comedy films
American comedy films
2010s English-language films
2010s American films